Lagazuoi is a mountain in the Dolomites of northern Italy, lying at an elevation of , about  southwest by road from Cortina d'Ampezzo in the Veneto Region. The mountain is part of the "Natural Park of the Ampezzo Dolomites".

It is accessible by cable car and contains the Rifugio Lagazuoi, a mountain refuge situated beyond the northwest corner of Cima del Lago.
 
The mountain range is well known for its wartime tunnels and First World War mine warfare.  The extensive tunnels were built by the Italian troops trying to wrest control from Austro-Hungarian troops who also built tunnels.  The tunnels are now open as a de facto museum.

See also
 Alta Via 1
 Italian front (World War I)
 White War

References

Geography of Cortina d'Ampezzo
Mountains of Veneto
Mountains of the Alps
Dolomites